The Estádio Algarve (Algarve Stadium), also known as Estádio Faro/Loulé (Faro/Loule Stadium), is an association football stadium located between Faro and Loulé municipalities, in the Algarve region of Portugal. The stadium has a capacity of 30,305 and was purposely built for the UEFA Euro 2004 championship.

History
The Estádio Algarve was designed in the summer of 2000 in accordance with UEFA and FIFA standards by Populous for the UEFA Euro 2004 championship hosted in Portugal. The design team included WS Atkins engineers and local partners including Marobal. The design is regional in nature, alluding to the maritime traditions of Portugal and harmonizing with the distinctive local landscape of the region of Algarve. The stadium is considered a model small/regional flexible use stadium for football and other sports and cultural events, being one of the most used stadiums in Portugal, compared to others used only for matches in the main Portuguese Football League. From 2004 to 2013, Louletano shared the stadium with Sporting Clube Farense. Since 2004, the Estádio Algarve has hosted several matches of the Portugal national football team. A former home of Farense and Louletano shortly after its inauguration, the stadium also received some Olhanense and Portimonense matches during their respective stadiums' works of renovation since those teams are also from the region of Algarve. The Algarve Stadium also hosts the final match of the Algarve Cup, a major annual international tournament in women's football.

The stadium hosted the inaugural Algarve Challenge Cup tournament on 22 and 24 July 2008 that saw Cardiff City, Celtic, Middlesbrough, and Vitória de Guimarães in action. Cardiff City were the eventual winners of the tournament with victories over Celtic and Vitória.

The Estádio Algarve was also the temporary home ground of the Gibraltar national football team around the mid-2010s. It will once again host Gibraltar from March 2023 while improvements are made to the Victoria Stadium.

Aside from football, it has also hosted music festivals and concerts, and has been temporarily converted into a super special stage during the Rally de Portugal, including the 2007 Rally de Portugal (part of the 2007 World Rally Championship season) and the 2010 Rally de Portugal (the sixth round of the 2010 World Rally Championship season).

Euro 2004 Matches

Portugal national football team

The following national team matches were held in the stadium.

Gibraltar national football team

The following national team matches were held in the stadium.

See also
 List of association football stadiums by capacity
 List of European stadiums by capacity

References

Algarve
Algarve
S.C. Farense
Buildings and structures in Faro, Portugal
Rally de Portugal
Sports venues completed in 2004